The following list of Jersey cemeteries lists cemeteries in the island of Jersey. The cemeteries are grouped by parish, and the list includes churchyards with graves.

St Brelade 
 Les Quennevais Parish Cemetery, Les Quennevais
 Parish Church of St. Brelade's churchyard

St Clement 
 Parish Church of St Clement

Grouville 
 La Croix Cemetery
 Grouville Church

St Helier 

 Almorah Cemetery, St. Helier
 Green Street Cemetery, St. Helier
 Old Mont à l'Abbé Cemetery, St. Helier
 New Mont à l'Abbé Cemetery
 Parish Church of St Helier
 Jewish Cemetery, Westmount
 Surville Cemetery, Surville
 Westmount Cemetery, St. Helier

St John 
 Macpéla Cemetery, Sion in Vingtaine de Hérupe
 Parish Church of St. John churchyard, in the village of St. John

St Lawrence 
 St Lawrence Parish Churchyard

St Martin 
 Parish Church of St. Martin churchyard, in the village of St. Martin
 Our Lady of the Annunciation Catholic Churchyard, in the village of St. Martin

St Mary 
 Parish Church of St. Mary churchyard

St Ouen 

 Parish Church of St. Ouen
 St. Ouen Methodist Churchyard, in the village of Leoville

St Peter 
 Parish Church of St Peter churchyard, in the village of St. Peter
 Philadelphe Methodist Churchyard, in the village of St. Peter
 St. Matthew Roman Catholic Churchyard, west of Le Carrefour Selous

St Saviour 
 Parish Church of St Saviour
 Allied War Cemetery, Howard Davis Park, St. Helier

Trinity 
  Holy Trinity Parish Churchyard and Cemetery, in the village of Trinity

References

External links 

 St Helier cemeteries
 Allied War Cemetery
 St. Clement's Church

Cemeteries
 
Jersey